William H. Burton House, also known as the National Memorial Day Museum, is a historic home located at Waterloo in Seneca County, New York.  It consists of a -story, three-bay offset front entrance main block with two rear wings.  The original 1830s Federal-style residence was modified to its present Italianate style in about 1870 and features a hipped roof and cupola.  In 1965, the building was purchased by the Waterloo Library and Historical Society to house collections and memorabilia related to the birth of Memorial Day in Waterloo in 1866.

It was listed on the National Register of Historic Places in 1996.

Gallery

References

External links

National Memorial Day Museum website

Museums in Seneca County, New York
Houses on the National Register of Historic Places in New York (state)
Historic house museums in New York (state)
History museums in New York (state)
Italianate architecture in New York (state)
Houses completed in 1870
Houses in Seneca County, New York
National Register of Historic Places in Seneca County, New York
Waterloo, New York